Karolinska Scales of Personality (KSP) is a personality test. 
A newer version of the test is Swedish Universities Scales of Personality.

KSP measures the personality with a 135 item questionnaire with answers on a four-point Likert scale.
The answers are grouped into 15 scales:
 Psychic anxiety
 Somatic anxiety
 Muscular tension
 Psychasthenia
 Inhibition of aggression
 Detachment
 Impulsiveness
 Monotony avoidance (sensation seeking)
 Socialization
 Indirect aggression
 Verbal aggression
 Irritability
 Suspicion
 Guilt
 Social desirability

KSP also exists in a Spanish version.

See also 
 NEO PI-R
 Temperament and Character Inventory

References

Personality tests